Faizol Nazlin bin Sayuti (born 27 October 1992) is a Malaysian footballer who mainly plays as centre-back but sometimes as a defensive midfielder. He is also the captain of 2013 Kelantan President Cup Team that is the champion Malaysia President Cup after winning in the final against Perak President Cup Team 2–1. He later loaned to Sabah on 2015 for a season.

Club career

Early career
Faizol began his football career playing for Kelantan President's Cup team in 2009. He was the captain of the team and managed to bring his team won the 2013 Presidents Cup. In 2014, he made his debut with Kelantan senior team. He has been sent to England to have a training with Blackburn Rovers, he has been sent there with another player, Dimitri Petratos.

Sabah FA
On 30 April 2015, Faizol signed with Malaysia Premier League side, Sabah on loan deal until the end of the 2015 season via second window transfer under Mike Mulvey as head coach.

MOF FC
In 2016, he later moved to FAM League club, MOF on one-year loan deal. Zahasmi Ismail was the head coach of the club that time. Faizol help the club secure second place of the table during 2016 FAM League season.

Kelantan
After a season with Putrajaya-based club, MOF loan ended, he returns to Kelantan at the end of the 2016 season. He remained with Kelantan for 2017 season till April 2018 before released by the club.

Club statistics

Club

Honours

Club
Kelantan U21
 Piala Presiden: 2013

Personal life
He also has a brother named Famirul Asyraf Sayuti who is also a football player

References

External links
 Faizol Nazlin Sayuti at stadiumastro.com

1992 births
Living people
Malaysian footballers
Sabah F.C. (Malaysia) players
MOF F.C. players
Kelantan FA players
Association football defenders
Association football midfielders
Malaysia Super League players
Malaysia Premier League players
People from Kelantan
Malaysian people of Malay descent